Max Schott (born 12 February 1935) is a writer of stories, novels, and essays. He was raised in Southern California.  He received his Bachelor's in Animal Husbandry from University of California, Davis and his Master's in English from the University of California, Santa Barbara. He was a lecturer in Literature for more than 30 years at the College of Creative Studies at UCSB.

Works

Books

Up Where I Used to Live: Stories (Illinois Short Fiction)

Murphy’s Romance: A Novel

Ben: A Novel

Keeping Warm: Essays and Stories

Films

Murphy's Romance – original story

External links 
 "Writer Max Schott Reads at UCSB" in the Santa Barbara Independent, November 8, 2007, by John Wilson (a fellow lecturer in CCS)
 Brief review of Ben in the New York Times, July 15, 1990, by Karen Ray
 "New Fiction Tales for a Summer's Day" in the Los Angeles Times, July 1, 1990 (payment required to view full article)
 "Martin Ritt: Maverick from Old Film School" in the Los Angeles Times, December 19, 1985 (payment required to view full article)

1935 births
Living people
20th-century American novelists
American male novelists
University of California, Santa Barbara alumni
American male short story writers
University of California, Davis alumni
20th-century American short story writers
20th-century American male writers